Stanford Jarrett (born 9 August 1977) is a Montserratian international footballer who plays as a midfielder.

Career
Jarrett made his international debut for Montserrat on 6 October 2010. He has three caps to date.

References

1977 births
Living people
Montserratian footballers
Montserrat international footballers
Association football midfielders